The 2016 Nicholls State Colonels football team represented Nicholls State University as a member of the Southland Conference during the 2016 NCAA Division I FCS football season. Led by second-year head coach Tim Rebowe, the Colonels compiled an overall record of 5–6 with a mark of 5–4 in conference play, tying for fourth place in the Southland. Nicholls State played home games at John L. Guidry Stadium in Thibodaux, Louisiana.

Schedule

Game summaries

@ Georgia

Sources:

Incarnate Word

Sources: Box Score

@ South Alabama

Sources:

@ McNeese State

Sources:

Stephen F. Austin

Sources:

@ Houston Baptist

Sources:

Sam Houston State

Sources:

@ Northwestern State

Sources:

Lamar

Sources:

@ Central Arkansas

Sources:

Southeastern Louisiana

Sources:

References

Nicholls State
Nicholls Colonels football seasons
Nicholls State Colonels football